Admiral Sir William Edward Parry,  (8 April 1893 – 21 August 1972) was an officer of the Royal Navy.

Naval career
Parry joined the Royal Navy 1905 and served in the First World War. He was appointed Officer in charge of the Anti-Submarine Establishment at Portland in 1936. In 1938 he attended the Imperial Defence College.

During the Second World War, he served as Commander-in-Chief of the New Zealand Division commanding  at the Battle of the River Plate in December 1939. In this battle he was wounded in the legs when shrapnel hit the bridge. He took part in the Normandy landings and served on the staff of Allied Naval Commander-in-Chief of the Expeditionary Force in 1944. After the war he became Deputy Head of the Naval Division at the Allied Control Commission in Germany. Parry became Director of Naval Intelligence in July 1946 and Chief of Naval Staff (Commander-in-Chief) of the Royal Indian Navy in August 1948. He was advanced to Knight Commander of the Order of the Bath in the 1950 New Year Honours before retiring in 1951.

In the 1956 film The Battle of the River Plate, Parry was played by Jack Gwillim.

References

External links
Royal Navy (RN) Officers 1939–1945

|-

|-

1893 births
1972 deaths
Military personnel from London
Graduates of the Royal College of Defence Studies
Chiefs of the Naval Staff (India)
Knights Commander of the Order of the Bath
People educated at Summer Fields School
People from Marylebone
Commanders of the Legion of Merit
Officiers of the Légion d'honneur
Royal Navy admirals
Royal Indian Navy admirals
Royal New Zealand Navy admirals
New Zealand military personnel of World War II
Royal Navy officers of World War II
Royal Navy officers of World War I
Directors of Naval Intelligence